Partridge River may refer to:

Canada
Partridge River (BC-Yukon), a river in the headwaters of the Yukon River in British Columbia and Yukon
Partridge River (Ontario)

United States
Minnesota
Partridge River (Crow Wing River), a tributary of the Crow Wing River
Partridge River (St. Louis River), a tributary of the St. Louis River

See also 
 Little Partridge River (disambiguation)
 Partridge (disambiguation)